Phai Phongsathon (born 12 June 1982) is a Luk thung and Mor lam singer from Isan area. He also plays professional football as a midfielder for Yasothon.

Biography
Phai Phongstorn's birth name is Prayoon Srijan, and he was born on 12 June 1982 at Yasothon Province to a poor family. He has four cousins.

He had many struggles in his life because he was born in a very poor family and his father died when he was young. He had to work hard for money to support his education. He graduated in Secondary 6, and went to Bangkok.

He graduated with a third class degree in business from Rattana Bundit University.

He entered the entertainment world in 2005 as a singer under the GMM Grammy label.

Discography

Filmography

TV Series

References

External links
 Facebook FanPage
 Instagram
 Twitter

Phai Phongsathon
Phai Phongsathon
1982 births
Living people
Phai Phongsathon
Phai Phongsathon
Association football midfielders